Ellen Woglom (born 1987) is an American actress best known for such films and television series as Crash, Outlaw, Wendy Wu: Homecoming Warrior, Hated, April Showers and Californication.

In 2017, she joined the cast of Marvel's Inhumans.

Filmography

Film

Television

References

External links

1987 births
Living people
21st-century American actresses
American film actresses
American television actresses
Place of birth missing (living people)